A khwaeng is an administrative subdivision used in the fifty districts of Bangkok and a few other city municipalities in Thailand. Currently, there are 180 khwaeng in Bangkok. A khwaeng is roughly equivalent to a tambon in other provinces of Thailand, smaller than an amphoe (district). With the creation of the special administrative area of Bangkok in 1972 the tambon within the area of the new administrative entity was converted into khwaeng. The common English translation for khwaeng is subdistrict.

Historically, in some regions of the country khwaeng referred to subdivisions of a province (then known as mueang, predating the modern term changwat), while in others they were called amphoe. Administrative reforms at the beginning of the 20th century standardized them to the term amphoe.

Khwaeng of Bangkok

Khwaeng in City Municipalities

See also
Subdivisions of Thailand

References

Subdivisions of Thailand
Types of administrative division